Huntington School may refer to:

Huntington School, York
Huntington School (Oregon)
Huntington School, a former Boston boys' school that is now part of the Chapel Hill – Chauncy Hall School